The 1882–83 United States Senate elections were held on various dates in various states. As these U.S. Senate elections were prior to the ratification of the Seventeenth Amendment in 1913, senators were chosen by state legislatures. Senators were elected over a wide range of time throughout 1882 and 1883, and a seat may have been filled months late or remained vacant due to legislative deadlock. In these elections, terms were up for the senators in Class 2.

The Republicans retained a narrow majority — 39 (and later 40) out of 76 seats — with the Readjusters in their caucus.

Results summary

Colored shading indicates party with largest share of that row.

Change in Senate composition

Before the elections 
After the November 15, 1882 special election in Georgia.

After the elections

Race summaries

Special elections during the 47th Congress 
In these elections, the winners were seated during 1882 or in 1883 before March 4; ordered by election date.

Races leading to the 48th Congress 

In these general elections, the winners were elected for the term beginning March 4, 1883; ordered by state.

All of the elections involved the Class 2 seats.

Elections during the 48th Congress 
In this election, the winner was elected in 1883 after March 4.

Iowa 

On January 25, 1882, the Iowa General Assembly elected James W. McDill (Republican) to finish the term over M. M. Ham and Daniel Campbell. James F. Wilson (Republican) was elected to the full six-year term on January 25, 1882 over L. G. Kinne and D. P. Subbs.

See also 
 1882 United States elections
 1882 United States House of Representatives elections
 47th United States Congress
 48th United States Congress

Notes

References 

 Party Division in the Senate, 1789-Present, via Senate.gov